Interstate 785 (I-785) is an auxiliary Interstate Highway in the US state of North Carolina. , it is completed through  eastern Guilford County, through a concurrency with I-840 along the Greensboro Urban Loop.

Route description
I-785 begins at the interchange of I-40/I-85.  Heading north, it connects with US Highway 70 (US 70) before ending at its current northern terminus at US 29. The entire route is in concurrency with I-840.

Future corridor signs of I-785 are marked along US 29 between Greensboro and Danville. The next phase of this project is now funded by the North Carolina Department of Transportation (NCDOT) from its current ending point at exit 14 to US 29/US 158 exit 153 at the northernmost Reidsville city limits. While fully funded, the project is divided into schedule to begin in 2020 with two interchanges located within Guilford and Rockingham counties. In Virginia, State Route 785 (SR 785) is the unsigned interim route number until I-785 is built to Interstate standards.

History

The designation was approved in 1997 at the request of a coalition of counties in North Carolina and Virginia who saw it as a way of further developing that area's economy. Most of the route will use existing US 29 north of Greensboro; however, for a few miles I-785 will run between US 29 and its parent route, I-85 on the Greensboro Urban Loop, which will also carry the I-840 designation. Construction of this highway was due to begin in 2011. With the upgrade of the Danville Expressway to a four-lane route in 2004, the I-785 route in Virginia is complete (and has been given the interim designation SR 785), but US 29 still needs to be upgraded to Interstate standards in North Carolina between the Greensboro Loop and Reidsville before the route can be signed as an Interstate. At that time, there were no projects scheduled by NCDOT to do so. Given that in the spring of 2006 NCDOT put up mileposts and added numbers to exit signs from Reidsville to the Virginia border reflecting US 29's mileage, an upgrade of this highway to an Interstate apparently was not in their immediate plans.

On July 31, 2013, NCDOT got approval from the Federal Highway Administration (FHWA) to cosign the first section of I-785 with I-840 in eastern Guilford County officially establishing I-785 in North Carolina.

The next section of I-785 opened on December 6, 2017, with hidden concurrency of I-840. With an estimated cost of $119 million (equivalent to $ in ), the  section, completing the eastern segment of the Greensboro Urban Loop, goes from US 70 (Burlington Road) to US 29, with an interchange at Huffine Mill Road. On September 13, 2019, a Reidsville Transportation Forum was held where it was announced I-785 is now funded and committed by NCDOT from its current ending point at exit 14 to US 29/US 158 exit 153 at the northernmost Reidsville city limits. Many officials from the North Carolina General Assembly and NCDOT presented at the forum, with the Reidsville Chamber of Commerce sharing quotes from these officials afterward regarding I-785. The construction of I-785 being extended to the city of Reidsville is a reflection of the city's growth as a center of transportation and commerce in the north Greensboro metropolitan area connecting with the Reidsville US 158 corridor.

Future

Once the entire Greensboro Urban Loop is completed, NCDOT and Greensboro DOT plan to extend Cone Boulevard (SR 2565) toward the McLeansville area and add an interchange. Plans for the interchange have existed since 2004; however, no time table or funding is available at this time, as it is expected to wait for the completion of the Greensboro Urban Loop. The state has allocated funding as of September 2019 to upgrade US 29 north of I-785 to the US 158/North Carolina Highway 14 (NC 14) junction in Reidsville to interstate standards, necessary for I-785 to be signed northward to Virginia, however construction is scheduled towards the middle of the decade, after the completion of the urban loop, and is estimated at a cost of $89 million. Roadway improvement and interchange upgrades to Summit Avenue (SR 2526) and Reedy Fork Parkway (SR 2790) in Browns Summit is planned to begin in 2020 with a scheduled completion in 2023, known as STIP Number R-4707, with an estimated cost of $44.1 million. NCDOT is currently upgrading exit signage for the current US 29 freeway stretch situated north of NC 14 in Reidsville. I-785 is now funded and committed project by NCDOT from its current ending point at exit 14 to US 29/US 158 exit 153 at the northernmost Reidsville city limits.  While fully funded, the project is divided into schedule to begin in 2020 with two interchanges located within Guilford and Rockingham counties.

Exit list

References

External links

 

85-7 North Carolina
85-7
85-7
7
85-7
Transportation in Greensboro, North Carolina
Transportation in Danville, Virginia